Derrick Capel Farr (7 February 191221 March 1986) was an English actor who appeared regularly in British films and television from 1938 until his death in 1986. His more famous roles include Group Captain John Whitworth in The Dam Busters.

Career
After working as a schoolteacher, he took to the stage in 1937, and in 1938 got his first film role. He served in the Second World War, and after the war resumed his acting career, mainly in character parts. He did, however, continue to appear as male leads and second male leads (with above-the-title billing) in a number of films in the late 1940s and 1950s, including Noose (1948), Murder Without Crime (1950) and Young Wives' Tale (1951).

In the early 1980s he played 16 roles in The War of the Roses cycle in the BBC Television Shakespeare series.

Personal life
His second marriage was in 1947 to actress Muriel Pavlow whom he met in 1941 while filming Quiet Wedding, and again on the set of The Shop at Sly Corner (1947). They remained married until Farr's death in March 1986, aged 74.

Partial filmography

 Miracles Do Happen (1938) – Greenlaw's Secretary (uncredited)
 The Outsider (1939) – (uncredited)
 Q Planes (1939) – Minor Role (uncredited)
 Black Eyes (1939) – Minor Role (uncredited)
 Inspector Hornleigh on Holiday (1939) – Bridge Club Member (uncredited)
 Freedom Radio (1941) – Hans
 Quiet Wedding (1941) – Dallas Chaytor
 Spellbound (1941) – Laurie Baxter
 Wanted for Murder (1946) – Jack Williams
 Quiet Weekend (1946) – Denys Royd
 Teheran (1946) – Pemberton Grant
 Code of Scotland Yard (1947) – Robert Graham
 Bond Street (1948) – Joe Marsh
 Noose (1948) – Capt. Jumbo Hyde
 The Story of Shirley Yorke (1948) – Gerald Ryton
 Silent Dust (1949) – Maxwell Oliver
 Man on the Run (1949) – Sgt. Peter Burden, alias Brown
 Double Confession (1950) – Jim Medway
 Murder Without Crime (1950) – Stephen
 Young Wives' Tale (1951) – Bruce Banning
 Reluctant Heroes (1951) – Michael Fone
 Little Big Shot (1952) – Sergeant Wilson
 Front Page Story (1954) – Teale
 Eight O'Clock Walk (1954) – Peter Tanner
 Bang! You're Dead (1954) – Detective Grey
 The Dam Busters (1955) – Group Captain J. N. H. Whitworth, D.S.O., D.F.C.
 Value for Money (1955) – Duke Popplewell
 The Man in the Road (1956) – Ivan Mason / Dr. James Paxton
 Town on Trial (1957) – Mark Roper
 Doctor At Large (1957) – Dr. Potter-Shine
 The Vicious Circle (1957) – Kenneth Palmer
 The Truth About Women (1957) – Anthony
 Attempt to Kill (1961) – Det. Insp. Minter
 Deadline Midnight (1961) – Paul Vetter
 The Saint (1962, TV Series) – John Clarron / Mrs. Jafferty
 The Projected Man (1966) – Inspector Davis
 30 Is a Dangerous Age, Cynthia (1968) – TV Announcer
 The Johnstown Monster (1971) – Hamer
 Pope Joan (1972) – Count Brisini
 Crossroads (1972–1973, TV Series) – Timothy Hunter
 Nightingale's Boys (1975, TV Series) – Bill Nightingale
 Some Mothers Do 'Ave 'Em (1978, TV Series) – Dr Mender
 Rumpole of the Bailey - Rumpole and the Man of God - (1979) - Rev Mordred Skinner
 We, the Accused (1980, TV series) – 	 Sir Kenneth Eddy

References

External links

1912 births
1986 deaths
English male film actors
Male actors from London
20th-century English male actors
British military personnel of World War II